The Arrangement can refer to:

 The Arrangement: A Novel, a 1967 work by Elia Kazan
 The Arrangement (1969 film), a film directed by Elia Kazan, adapted from his novel
 The Arrangement (2010 TV series), a 2010 reality series on Logo
 The Arrangement (2017 TV series), a 2017 drama television series on E!